There are several ways of determining the centre of Canada giving different locations.

Longitude

There is a sign on the Trans-Canada Highway at 96°48'35"W (slightly east of Winnipeg) proclaiming it the longitudinal centre of Canada; in effect, the north-south line midway between the extreme points of Canada on the east and west, including islands (including Newfoundland since 1949).

Latitude
The latitudinal centre of Canada (including islands, but excluding Canada's claim to the North Pole) is a line at 62 degrees 24 minutes North.

Intersection of latitude and longitude
The intersection of these two lines is one definition of the centre point of Canada, as explained by the Atlas of Canada's website:

The nearest inhabited places to this point are Baker Lake, Nunavut well to the north, and Arviat to the east.

Pole of inaccessibility
The pole of inaccessibility of Canada (the point furthest from any coastline or land border) is near Jackfish River, Alberta at 34-115-17-W4 (Latitude: 59°2′ 60 N, Longitude: 112°49′ 60 W). (Pole of inaccessibility says 59 1 48 and 112 49 12.)

References

External links
The centre of controversy: Where is Canada's middle? - Maclean's

Geographical centres
Geography of Canada